Caneva is a comune (municipality) in the Province of Pordenone in the Italian region Friuli-Venezia Giulia, located about  northwest of Trieste and about  west of Pordenone.

Caneva borders the following municipalities: Cordignano, Fontanafredda, Fregona, Polcenigo, Sacile, Sarmede, Tambre.

Demographic evolution

Twin towns
Caneva is twinned with:

  Neumarkt-Sankt Veit, Germany, since 2002

Gallery

References

External links

 comune.caneva.pn.it/

Cities and towns in Friuli-Venezia Giulia